Garren Lake Stitt, (born January 21, 2003) often credited as either Garren Lake or LAKE!, is an American actor and singer. He is best known for his roles in General Hospital and Andi Mack with the former earning him a Daytime Emmy Award nomination for Outstanding Younger Actor in a Drama Series.

Personal life
Stitt was born in Alexandria, Virginia. His mother is Brazilian. When he was 3 years old, he moved to California with his single mother, Yvette, and his older brother, Gabriel.

Career

Acting
Stitt started acting in 2011 with short films and minor television roles. In 2013, he was cast in his first film roles; Love Triangle, the James Franco directed film, Bukowski, and No Ordinary Hero: The SuperDeafy Movie. His first recurring TV role was as Connor in 4 episodes of  Nicky, Ricky, Dicky & Dawn.

Stitt landed the major recurring role of Marty (nicknamed Marty from the Party), a competitive charmer on Buffy Driscoll's track team, in Disney Channel's Andi Mack. He temporarily left the show during the second season to film General Hospital but returned for the third.

Stitt replaced Rio Mangini as Oscar Nero on General Hospital in 2017, a role for which he received a 2019 Daytime Emmy nomination for Outstanding Younger Actor in a Drama Series. He left when his character died in 2019.

Music
In 2021, Stitt started releasing pop music under the name LAKE!, he released his debut single "Dead Roses" in February 2021. The song was described as a "hip hop-alternative track" which finds Lake taking more of a "808 trap drum-driven and melodic pop sound".

Filmography

Film

Television

Awards and nominations

References

External links
 

2003 births
Living people
21st-century American male actors
American male child actors
American male film actors
American male soap opera actors
American male television actors
American people of Brazilian descent
Male actors from Alexandria, Virginia
Male actors of Brazilian descent
Brazilian actors
Brazilian American